Baron Maclay, of Glasgow in the County of Lanark, is a title in the Peerage of the United Kingdom. It was created in 1922 for the Scottish businessman Sir Joseph Maclay, 1st Baronet. He was Chairman of Maclay & Macintyre, shipowners, of Glasgow, and also served as Minister of Shipping in the war-time coalition of David Lloyd George, without being in Parliament. Maclay had already been created a Baronet, of Park Terrace in the City of Glasgow in the County of Lanark, in 1914. His eldest surviving son, the second Baron, represented Paisley in the House of Commons as a Liberal.  the titles are held by the latter's eldest son, the third Baron, who succeeded in 1969.

Another member of the Maclay family was the politician John Maclay, 1st Viscount Muirshiel. He was the fifth son of the first Baron Maclay.

In 1913, the first Lord Maclay purchased Duchal House in Kilmacolm, Inverclyde which remains the family home to this day. The former Lords Maclay are buried alongside the Viscount Muirshiel in the graveyard of Mount Zion Church in Quarrier's Village.

Barons Maclay (1922)
Joseph Paton Maclay, 1st Baron Maclay (1857–1951)
Joseph Paton Maclay, 2nd Baron Maclay (1899–1969)
Joseph Paton Maclay, 3rd Baron Maclay (born 1942)

The heir apparent is the present holder's son Joseph Paton Maclay (born 1977).

See also
Viscount Muirshiel

Notes

References
 «Lord Maclay. Shipping magnate. To visit Australia» // «The Sydney Morning Herald», Tuesday 16 December 1924, p. 8, photo
 Kidd, Charles, Williamson, David (editors). Debrett's Peerage and Baronetage (1990 edition). New York: St Martin's Press, 1990, 
 

Baronies in the Peerage of the United Kingdom
Noble titles created in 1922